Season 2002–03 was a disappointment for Hibernian, as the team finished in the bottom half of the Scottish Premier League in Bobby Williamson's first full season in charge. The team were also knocked out of the two domestic cup competitions at an early stage. In a preview for the next season, BBC Sport commented that the biggest problem "was a fragile defence that developed a nasty habit of conceding late goals".

League season 
Hibs got off to a very poor start to the league season, collecting only three points from a possible 18. This included heavy defeats by Hearts and Dunfermline. Former Hibs player Ulrik Laursen commented in the match programme for his new club, Celtic, that he believed former Hibs manager Alex McLeish (now at Rangers) was to blame for this decline in fortunes, due to his decision to release popular players such as Mixu Paatelainen and Stuart Lovell. Hibs lost the game 1–0 at Celtic Park and remained bottom of the early league table, but fortunes immediately improved, as Hibs won their next five league games in succession.

This revival meant that they were in a good league position going into the third Edinburgh derby of the season, on 2 January, where victory would mean that Hibs would leapfrog Hearts into third place. Hibs twice took a two-goal lead, but conceded two goals (both scored by Graham Weir) late in stoppage time to gift Hearts a 4–4 draw. Hibs then lost their next five league games and drifted down the league, eventually finishing in 7th place.

Results

Final table

Scottish League Cup 
As one of the SPL clubs who had not automatically qualified for European competition, Hibs entered at the last 32 stage (second round) of the competition, in which they defeated Alloa Athletic 2–0. Hibs were then drawn against Rangers, managed by former Hibs boss Alex McLeish, at home in the last 16. The match proved to be a "miserable night" for Hibs, as the tie was lost 3–2 despite taking an early lead. The lead was quickly turned into a deficit by an own goal and a defensive error by Derek Townsley. Despite Garry O'Connor's goal levelling the score midway through the second half, Rangers scored what proved to be the winning goal soon afterwards. Gary Smith was sent off late on, reducing Hibs to ten men. To top things off, midfielder Alen Orman had what appeared to be an epileptic seizure during the first half and had to be substituted.

Results

Scottish Cup

Results

Transfers 
During this period, Hibs were experiencing severe financial problems, due to a "collapse in television revenues". Hibs chairman Ken Lewandowski stated that the club's debt burden at the financial year end would be approximately £17M, and that the club could only continue to operate due to the support offered by majority shareholder Tom Farmer. At the end of the season, the club explored the possibility of selling Easter Road and sharing a new ground with Edinburgh derby rivals Hearts. During the summer of 2002, Hibs somewhat addressed these financial deficits by selling Ulises de la Cruz and Ulrik Laursen. De la Cruz was sold just one season after Hibs had bought him for a club record fee.

Players In

Players Out

Loans In

Loans Out

Player stats 

During the 2002–03 season, Hibs used 30 different players in competitive games. The table below shows the number of appearances and goals scored by each player.

|}

See also
List of Hibernian F.C. seasons

References

External links 
Fixtures & Results, Hibernian F.C. official site
Hibernian 2002/2003 results and fixtures, Soccerbase

Hibernian F.C. seasons
Hibernian